Norbert Trelle (born 5 September 1942) is a prelate of the Roman Catholic Church. He served as auxiliary bishop of Cologne from 1992 till 2005, when he became bishop of Hildesheim.

Life 
Born in Kassel, Trelle was ordained to the priesthood on 2 February 1968.

On 25 March 1992 he was appointed auxiliary bishop of Cologne and titular bishop of Egnatia. Trelle received his episcopal consecration on the following 1 May from Joachim Cardinal Meisner, archbishop of Cologne, with the auxiliary bishop emeritus of Cologne, Augustinus Frotz, and the auxiliary bishop of Cologne, Klaus Dick, serving as co-consecrators.

On 29 November 2005 he was appointed bishop of Hildesheim, where he was installed on 11 February 2006 untíl 9 September 2017.

External links 
 Entry about Norbert Trelle at catholic-hierarchy.org

|-

1942 births
20th-century German Roman Catholic bishops
21st-century German Roman Catholic bishops
Roman Catholic bishops of Hildesheim
People from Kassel
Living people
20th-century German Roman Catholic priests